Joseph G. Wargo (August 4, 1922 – August 21, 1999) was a Democratic member of the Pennsylvania House of Representatives.

References

Democratic Party members of the Pennsylvania House of Representatives
1922 births
1999 deaths
20th-century American politicians